The Wendell Town Common Historic District encompasses the historic heart of the small town of Wendell, Massachusetts.  Centered on a town common established in 1782, it includes a significant number of well preserved Greek Revival buildings.  The district was listed on the National Register of Historic Places in 1992.

Description and history
The hill town of Wendell, located in eastern Franklin County, was settled in 1754 and incorporated in 1781.  Its town center, roughly located at its geographic center, dates to the period of incorporation, when a meetinghouse (no longer standing) was built, and the town common and cemetery were laid out.  The oldest surviving building, the Congregational parsonage, was built in 1823.  The immediate area surrounding the center has remained rural into the 20th century, with the town's only industry at Wendell Depot and Farley to the north along the railroad.  The town's population gradually decreased over much of the 19th century, leaving a town center with a significant number of Greek Revival buildings from the 1840s.

It is bounded on its north, east, and south by Center Road. The sides of the roads opposite the common are lined with institutional buildings and houses that are predominantly in the Greek Revival style and date to the first half of the 19th century. The only contributing 20th-century building is the Colonial Revival library, built 1921. The town hall, located in the district, is a Greek Revival building that was probably once a Baptist church built in 1845. There is one other church building, that of the Congregationalists; it was built in 1846. There is one school in the district; it is a typical 19th-century district schoolhouse, also built in 1846.

See also
National Register of Historic Places listings in Franklin County, Massachusetts

References

Historic districts on the National Register of Historic Places in Massachusetts
National Register of Historic Places in Franklin County, Massachusetts